Stephen Matoc Dut (died July 28, 2011) was a South Sudanese politician. He was elected to the Lakes State Legislative Assembly as the SPLM candidate in the Maper constituency with 2,536 votes (83.61%).

He died July 28, 2011 after falling unconscious at the Legislative Assembly in Rumbek two days earlier. He was 40 years old at the time.

References

2011 deaths
Members of the Lakes State Legislative Assembly